CultureMap is a British think tank that specialises in understanding SMEs or small businesses and entrepreneurs.

History
CultureMap was founded in 2002. The organisation partnered with BMRB and the Durham Business School to develop the Business Culture Index (BCI).

References

Political and economic think tanks based in the United Kingdom
Think tanks established in 2002
2002 establishments in the United Kingdom